Guéblange-lès-Dieuze (literally Guéblange near Dieuze) is a commune in the Moselle department in Grand Est in north-eastern France.

It is 1 km north west of Lindre-Basse.

See also
 Communes of the Moselle department
 Parc naturel régional de Lorraine

References

External links
 

Gueblangelesdieuze